Marina Vasilyevna Kroschina (18 April 1953 — 4 July 2000) was a Ukrainian tennis player who competed for the Soviet Union. She won the 1971 Wimbledon girls' singles championships while competing for the Kazakh SSR, her country of birth.

Life
Marina Kroschina was born on 18 April 1953 in the city of Alma Ata, Kazakhstan in the Soviet Union. Her father was a painter and architect, and her mother, Olga Zobachova, a champion of chess in Uzbekistan and Central Asia. She had a romantic relationship with Nikita Mikhalkov. Kroschina committed suicide on 4 July 2000 in Kyiv.

Career
Kroschina won the 1972 European Championship and the All England Plate in 1974.  She had some success in the doubles events, winning three titles with Olga Morozova.

References

External links
 

1953 births
2000 suicides
Suicides by jumping in Ukraine
Wimbledon junior champions
Soviet female tennis players
Grand Slam (tennis) champions in girls' singles
Universiade medalists in tennis
Universiade gold medalists for the Soviet Union
Universiade bronze medalists for the Soviet Union
2000 deaths